Elk Grove Township is one of 29 townships in Cook County, Illinois, USA.  As of the 2010 census, its population was 92,905. Elk Grove Township formerly housed the United Airlines headquarters.

Geography

Cities, towns, villages
 Arlington Heights
 Des Plaines (west edge)
 Elk Grove Village
 Mount Prospect (southern portions)
 Rolling Meadows
 Schaumburg (east edge)

Unincorporated Towns
 Schnells Corner at

Adjacent townships
 Wheeling Township (north)
 Maine Township (east)
 Addison Township, DuPage County (south)
 Bloomingdale Township, DuPage County (southwest)
 Schaumburg Township (west)
 Palatine Township (northwest)

Cemeteries
The township contains Elk Grove Cemetery.

Major highways
  Interstate 90
  Interstate 290
  U.S. Route 14
  Illinois Route 53
  Illinois Route 58
  Illinois Route 62
  Illinois Route 72
  Illinois Route 83

Lakes
 Fountain Lake
 Fred Hasse Lake

Landmarks
 Busse Woods Forest Preserve (vast majority)
 O'Hare International Airport
 United States Highway Army Reserve Center, Arlington Heights
 Elk Grove High School
 Rolling Meadows High School

Demographics

School districts
 City of Chicago School District 299
 Township High School District 214
 Community Consolidated School District 59

Political districts
 Illinois's 6th congressional district
 State House District 65
 State House District 66
 State Senate District 33

Economy
Elk Grove Township formerly had the corporate headquarters of United Airlines. In 2006 United Airlines announced that it would be moving its headquarters and its 350 top executives from Elk Grove Township to 77 West Wacker Drive in the Chicago Loop. After the City of Chicago gave additional financial incentives, United proceeded to schedule a move of its remaining employees out of the former Elk Grove Township headquarters into the Willis Tower (Sears Tower) in Chicago in the northern hemisphere of fall 2010. Monica Davey of The New York Times said that the move may have contributed to United's decision to base the new merged airline out of Chicago instead of Houston. The former headquarters is now a part of Mount Prospect, which annexed the land in the 2010s. In December 2021, it was reported that United would sell the campus to CloudHQ, which plans to build a data center.

References
 
 United States Census Bureau 2007 TIGER/Line Shapefiles
 United States National Atlas

External links

 Elk Grove Township official website
 City-Data.com
 Illinois State Archives
 Township Officials of Illinois
 Cook County official site

Townships in Cook County, Illinois
Townships in Illinois